Colt 45 is an American brand of lager or malt liquor made and primarily marketed in the United States, originally introduced by National Brewing Company in the spring of 1963. Through a series of mergers and acquisitions, the National Brewing Company and its brands (including Colt 45) are today owned by the Pabst Brewing Company.

Colt 45 is available today in a multitude of packages and sizes. Cans are available in 12-, 16-, 24-, and 32-ounce packages and bottles are available in 7-, 12-, 16-, 18-, 22-, 32-, and 40-ounce packages. Cans are available in multi-packs including: 6-, 12-, 15-, 18-, 24-, 30-, 36-, and 42-packs of 12-ounce cans.

History
National Brewing Company introduced Colt 45 in 1963. Previously, the only major national brand of malt liquor was Country Club. The label was designed with a kicking horse and horseshoe, a reference to its "extra kick" compared to competing brands. 
Listed on the Pabst website as a "Fun Fact", Colt 45 was named after running back Jerry Hill of the 1963 Baltimore Colts, who wore the number 45 and not the .45 caliber handgun ammunition round. The credited name change came because of malt liquor’s association with violence in disenfranchised neighborhoods.

Advertising
Throughout most of the 60s and 70s, Colt 45 was marketed towards the suburban white-collar middle class demographic.  To this end, in a memorable ad campaign that lasted over 15 years, Billy Van portrayed a gentleman in suit and tie quietly sitting at a small table and taking little notice of all the activity going on around him, until a waiter or someone showed up with a schooner glass and a can of Colt 45.  Music resembling Song of the Nairobi Trio played in the background while a voice-over announcer intoned:

In subsequent commercials, the surroundings became increasingly peculiar, including, but not limited to:
sitting on the shore of a busy beach
at the end of an airport runway
on an ice rink, in front of the goal during a hockey game
in a bullring, during a bullfight
an encounter with a shark in the middle of the ocean or bay
at the bottom of a ski jump (which featured a cameo by Redd Foxx)

The one constant in each of these commercials was Van himself, who remained unperturbed while sitting at the table, though in some instances he became indirectly involved in the tumult unfolding around him.  Van won a 1975 Clio Award for one of these commercials.

By 1978, the "waiting man" commercials were replaced with more contemporary ads and the slogan "That Dynamite Taste"; one of the new commercials briefly featured an unknown Ted Danson.  Beginning in 1980, Colt 45 began a long association with actor Billy Dee Williams, who appeared in their print and billboard ads as well as on television.  The product's slogan during that era, as stated by Williams in his television commercials, was, "It works every time."  Williams responded indifferently to criticism of his appearances in the liquor commercials.

In Mr. Freedom, the title character drinks several cans of Colt 45 before suiting up from sheriff to white nationalist superhero.

Related products
Colt 45 makers experimented briefly with a mint-flavored derivative, marketed under the name Cool Colt, in the early 1990s. Available in limited quantities, it was largely met with puzzlement from loyal customers. While it was in production, the slogan for Cool Colt was "Taste the Cool."  Apparently, it was designed to pair with menthol cigarettes.

A double malt version—titled Colt 45 Double Malt—is also produced; and in certain regions, such as Montana, has 8.5% abv. Sold in only certain regions, the label is distinguishable by two horseshoes rather than the standard single one.

In 2011, Pabst Brewing introduced Blast by Colt 45. Snoop Dogg signed on to promote the beverage as Blast's "brand ambassador". The 12% ABV fruit-flavored malt beverage has been criticized for targeting underage drinkers. In order to comply with FDA regulations, Blast by Colt does not contain caffeine, taurine, or guarana.

References

External links 
 

American beer brands
Pabst Brewing Company
Products introduced in 1963